Queen Elizabeth's Almhouses are almshouses in Richmond, London, founded by Sir George Wright in 1600 (during the reign of Elizabeth I) to house eight poor aged women. Known originally as the "lower almshouses", they were built in Petersham Road, a few hundred yards south of what is now Bridge Street.  By 1767, they were almost derelict. In 1767, William Turner rebuilt the almshouses on land at the top end of his estate in The Vineyard. Funds for the rebuilding were raised by public subscription. The almshouses were rebuilt again in 1857. They were damaged during World War II and replaced with four newly built houses in 1955.

Current status
The almshouses are now managed by The Richmond Charities. New residents are accepted from 65 years of age.

See also
List of almshouses in the United Kingdom

Notes and references

External links
The Richmond Charities

1600 establishments in England
Almshouses in Richmond, London
Elizabeth I
History of the London Borough of Richmond upon Thames
Residential buildings completed in 1600
Residential buildings completed in 1767
Residential buildings completed in 1857
Residential buildings completed in 1955
The Vineyard, Richmond